Sébastien Turgot (born 11 April 1984) is a French former professional road bicycle racer, who rode professionally between 2008 and 2016 for the  and  teams.

His third place was not expected by anybody but was a confirmation of his abilities, as demonstrated by his multiple French national track championship titles. In 2012, Turgot was runner-up in one of the most prestigious races of the cycling calendar, Paris–Roubaix.

Major results

2006
 6th La Côte Picarde
2007
 1st Overall Les 3 Jours de Vaucluse
1st Young rider classification
 8th Overall Tour de Bretagne
1st Stage 4
 9th Overall Le Triptyque des Monts et Châteaux
2008
 2nd Overall Tour Ivoirien de la Paix
1st Stage 2
 3rd Paris–Tours
 3rd Grand Prix de la Somme
 6th Overall Tour du Poitou-Charentes
2010
 7th Kuurne–Brussels–Kuurne
 8th Overall Three Days of De Panne
1st Stage 2
 8th Châteauroux Classic
2011
 2nd Overall Boucles de la Mayenne
1st Prologue
 10th Overall Danmark Rundt
2012
 2nd Paris–Roubaix
 4th Polynormande
 5th Road race, National Road Championships
 5th Duo Normand (with Damien Gaudin)
 6th Overall Tour de Picardie
 8th Scheldeprijs
 10th Overall Three Days of De Panne
 10th E3 Harelbeke
2013
 8th Tour of Flanders
 9th La Roue Tourangelle
 10th E3 Harelbeke
 10th Paris–Roubaix
2014
 3rd Cholet-Pays de Loire
 7th Tro-Bro Léon
2015
 5th Grand Prix Pino Cerami
 9th Overall Tour de Wallonie

Grand Tour general classification results timeline

References

External links

French male cyclists
1984 births
Living people
Sportspeople from Limoges
Cyclists from Nouvelle-Aquitaine